Hurricane Claudette was a moderately strong tropical cyclone that struck South Texas in July 2003. A fairly long-lived July Atlantic hurricane, Claudette was the fourth depression, third tropical storm and first hurricane of the 2003 Atlantic hurricane season. Claudette began as a tropical wave in the eastern Caribbean. It moved quickly westward, brushing past the Yucatán Peninsula before moving northwestward through the Gulf of Mexico. Claudette remained a tropical storm until just before making landfall in Port O'Connor, Texas, when it quickly strengthened to a strong Category 1 hurricane on the Saffir-Simpson Hurricane Scale. Forecasting of its path and intensity was uncertain throughout its lifetime, resulting in widespread and often unnecessary preparations along its path.

Claudette was the first hurricane to make landfall in July in the United States since Hurricane Danny in the 1997 season. The hurricane caused two deaths and moderate damage in Texas, mostly from strong winds, as well as extensive beach erosion. Because of the damage, President George W. Bush declared portions of South Texas a Federal Disaster Area, allowing the affected citizens to apply for aid. Claudette also caused significant rainfall and minor damage in the Mexican state of Quintana Roo as a tropical storm, as well as minor damage on Saint Lucia before developing into a tropical cyclone.

Meteorological history

A tropical wave moved off the coast of Africa on July 1. It steadily organized as it moved westward, and resembled a tropical depression by July 7. However, surface reports and reconnaissance aircraft indicated the system did not have tropical characteristics, and remained simply a low-pressure system. The wave produced tropical storm-force winds as it moved through the Lesser Antilles on July 8, but did not acquire tropical characteristics until it reached the eastern Caribbean. Because it had tropical storm-force winds, the system was upgraded immediately to Tropical Storm Claudette after it developed a low-level circulation later on July 8.

By early on July 9, while south of Puerto Rico, Claudette quickly strengthened over the warm waters of the Caribbean, and its strongest winds were just shy of the threshold for hurricane intensity. Possibly due to its fast forward motion, the storm became disorganized and weakened. Conditions briefly became more favorable over the western Caribbean, and Claudette reached hurricane status for six hours on July 10. Soon after, the storm encountered unfavorable upper-level winds and weakened back into a tropical storm. In response to a break in the subtropical ridge—a high-pressure ridge that often prevents tropical systems from moving northward—it turned to the west-northwest. Claudette made its first landfall at Puerto Morelos on the Yucatán Peninsula, on July 11, as a tropical storm with  winds.

Claudette wobbled to the northwest over the Gulf of Mexico and gradually restrengthened. Upper-level winds steadily decreased, and Claudette again became a hurricane late on July 14. Just prior to landfall, it strengthened quickly and picked up its forward motion in a more westerly direction, striking Port O'Connor, Texas, on July 15, as a Category 1 hurricane on the Saffir-Simpson Hurricane Scale with 90 mph (150 km/h) winds. Residents along and inland of the central Texas coast were caught off guard both by its intensity and its time of arrival. The hurricane was projected to make landfall in the evening hours of July 15, but instead came ashore before noon. Furthermore, some initial estimates suggested that Claudette had reached Category 2 status, with sustained winds of up to 100 mph (155 km/h); these were based on unofficial observations which were not backed up by official data.

As slow as Claudette was to strengthen, it was also slow to dissipate over land. It maintained tropical storm intensity for over 24 hours after landfall, a rarity for such a weak storm; most tropical systems weaken rapidly after landfall, as they are separated from the warm waters that power them. The storm finally lost its low-level circulation early on July 17 over Chihuahua, although its rainfall and upper-level circulation crossed over Southern California and continued into the Pacific Ocean.

Preparations
Mexican officials issued a tropical storm warning 37 hours prior to the storm's landfall between Chetumal and Cabo Catoche, Quintana Roo. The warning was upgraded to a hurricane warning about a day before landfall, but was downgraded when Claudette weakened just 13 hours prior to its landfall in the Yucatán Peninsula. The Mexican government declared a state of emergency in the projected path of the storm, and declared an evacuation order for 1,500 citizens in Quintana Roo. There, residents remained calm during the evacuation. Tourists left nightclubs for supermarkets to stock up on, among other items, beer, which was banned at midnight. Schools were set up as shelters, while police forced tourists to remain in their hotels.

The consistent variation in the path of Claudette caused uncertainty over the strength and location of its final landfall. On July 13, two days prior to Claudette's eventual landfall, the National Hurricane Center issued a hurricane watch between Brownsville and Port O'Connor, Texas. By the next day, a hurricane warning existed from Baffin Bay to High Island, Texas, while a tropical storm warning extended from High Island to Intracoastal City, Louisiana. When it became apparent that Louisiana would not be affected significantly by the storm, the state's tropical storm warnings were canceled. In Texas, Galveston County officials recommended evacuations for western Galveston Island and Jamaica Beach, 24 hours prior to Claudette's projected landfall. The Emergency Phone Notification System notified citizens in the evening to avoid evacuating during the night. Many citizens heeded the evacuation suggestion, some of whom remembered the flooding from Tropical Storm Frances five years before.

Hurricane Claudette also affected the oil industry. ExxonMobil, Chevron Corporation, ConocoPhillips, Royal Dutch Shell, Marathon Oil, Unocal Corporation, and Anadarko Petroleum all limited production and evacuated many of their workers. Chevron, which evacuated more than 1,800 workers, returned many of its workers on the day when Claudette made landfall. Unocal closed 23 rigs and platforms in the region.

Impact

Outside of Texas, Hurricane Claudette caused little damage due to its low intensity. In total, damage estimates rose to $180 million (2003 USD, $198 million 2006 USD), and the storm caused one direct and two indirect deaths. One of the indirect deaths was when a man in Navarre Beach, Florida had a heart attack while surfing in the eastern Gulf of Mexico. The second indirect death involved a woman being killed by a falling tree limb in Texas, after the storm had passed.

Caribbean Sea

As a tropical wave, Claudette dropped torrential rainfall and brought strong winds to the island of Saint Lucia. On the northern and eastern portions of the island, the strong winds ripped off roofs and downed trees across roadways. Overall, damage was light, and amounted to $1.1 million (2003 USD, $  USD).

Also, flooding in metropolitan areas blocked traffic for cars and pedestrians. Banana and other fruit plantations in the southwestern portion of the country experienced severe damage, although exact damage totals are unknown.

Many fishermen moved their boats from the water to safety, while a cruise line diverted three ships away from Claudette's path.

On Mexico's Yucatán Peninsula, Claudette lashed strong waves against the coastline at Cancún, but overall caused light damage. Winds were moderate, causing the Cancún International Airport to delay several flights, though there were no cancellations. Overall, Claudette sank a few small boats and flooded a few streets in Cancún, though damage was minor in the Yucatán Peninsula.

Texas

On Matagorda Island, the local weather station measured winds of —the only official report of hurricane-force winds along the coastline. This report would suggest the storm was a low-end Category 2 hurricane, though this contradicted Hurricane Hunters' data, which pointed to a storm of a lesser intensity.

Severe beach erosion occurred from High Island to Freeport, though large geotextiles-tubes reduced the erosion on Galveston Island and the Bolivar Peninsula. The outer bands of the hurricane spawned two tornadoes. One was an F1 on the Fujita scale that caused damage to several buildings in Palacios, and the other damaged homes in Port Lavaca.

Widespread flooding and gusty winds destroyed 204 houses along the southeast Texas coastline, most of which occurred in Matagorda County. In addition, the winds damaged 1,407 homes, with 144 of them being severely damaged. The wind also affected 147 businesses, of which 64 were either destroyed or severely damaged. Strong winds downed numerous power lines, leaving around 74,000 residents without power in the immediate aftermath. Overall, Claudette caused $180 million (2003 USD, $  USD) in damage in Texas and one death directly from a fallen tree during the storm. Also, the storm was indirectly responsible for another death, when a tree limb fell on a woman in the aftermath of the storm.

Aftermath

On July 17, President George W. Bush declared 18 south Texas counties as a federal disaster area. Within 2 months of the storm, over 15,000 citizens registered for assistance. The government approved $34.8 million (2003 USD, $  USD) in aid, of which nearly half went to basic house repairs. The Federal Emergency Management Agency (FEMA) provided 75% of the $1.35 million (2003 USD, $  USD) debris removal cost, with the other 25% being covered through local agencies. FEMA also provided $1.26 million (2003 USD, $  USD) to repair geo-tubes on the Bolivar Peninsula in Galveston County. The geo-tubes, which protect buildings along coastal areas, were severely damaged by the hurricane.

In western Texas, heavy rainfall of up to  temporarily sparked widespread growth of wildflowers in a normally arid landscape. The rainfall restored the flow of the Rio Grande at Big Bend National Park, which had ceased in the area due to lack of rainfall.

See also

 Tropical cyclones in 2003
 Other storms with the same name
 List of Texas hurricanes (1980–present)
 List of Category 1 Atlantic hurricanes
 Hurricane Bret (1999) – A Category 4 hurricane that affected South Texas
 Hurricane Hanna (2020) – A Category 1 hurricane that also affected South Texas

References

External links

2003 Atlantic hurricane season
2003 in Mexico
2003 natural disasters in the United States
Atlantic hurricanes in Mexico
Category 1 Atlantic hurricanes
Hurricanes in Texas
Claudette